No Name No Color is the debut LP by Middle Class Rut, released October 4, 2010 under exclusive Worldwide license to Bright Antenna. The album was made available as a Digital Download, CD and Limited Edition 12" Double Record.

Reception

No Name No Color has received generally positive reviews. On the review aggregate site Metacritic, the album has a score of 76 out of 100, indicating "generally favorable reviews."

On March 5, 2011, No Name No Color reached #22 on Billboard's Heatseekers Chart.

Track listing
Busy Bein' Born - 4:47
USA - 3:33
New Low - 4:16
Lifelong Dayshift - 4:27
One Debt Away - 3:22
Are You On Your Way - 6:22
Alive or Dead - 4:48
I Guess You Could Say - 4:19
Sad to Know - 4:08
Dead End - 4:29
Thought I Was - 4:38
Cornbred - 4:24

Deluxe Edition Bonus Tracks

Critical Emotional - 3:46
Free Lot - 4:24
New Low (Music Video) - 4:38

Singles

References

2010 albums
Middle Class Rut albums